

Peerage of England

|Duke of Cornwall (1337)||Edward, the Black Prince||1337||1376||
|-
|Earl of Surrey (1088)||John de Warenne, 7th Earl of Surrey||1304||1347||
|-
|Earl of Warwick (1088)||Thomas de Beauchamp, 11th Earl of Warwick||1315||1369||
|-
|Earl of Arundel (1138)||Richard FitzAlan, 10th Earl of Arundel||1331||1376||Restored
|-
|rowspan="2"|Earl of Oxford (1142)||Robert de Vere, 6th Earl of Oxford||1297||1331||Died
|-
|John de Vere, 7th Earl of Oxford||1331||1360||
|-
|rowspan="2"|Earl of Hereford (1199)||John de Bohun, 5th Earl of Hereford||1322||1336||Died
|-
|Humphrey de Bohun, 6th Earl of Hereford||1336||1361||
|-
|Earl of Lincoln (1217)||Alice de Lacy, 4th Countess of Lincoln||1311||1348||
|-
|Earl of Leicester (1265)||Henry Plantagenet, 3rd Earl of Leicester and Lancaster||1326||1345||
|-
|rowspan="2"|Earl of Richmond (1306)||John of Brittany, Earl of Richmond||1306||1334||Died
|-
|John III, Duke of Brittany||1334||1341||
|-
|rowspan="2"|Earl of Norfolk (1312)||Thomas of Brotherton, 1st Earl of Norfolk||1312||1338||Died, peerage lapsed between his two daughters and coheirs
|-
|none||1338||1375||
|-
|rowspan="3"|Earl of Kent (1321)||Edmund of Woodstock, 1st Earl of Kent||1321||1330||Attainted; died
|-
|Edmund, 2nd Earl of Kent||1330||1331||Restored; died
|-
|John, 3rd Earl of Kent||1331||1352||
|-
|rowspan="2"|Earl of March (1328)||Roger Mortimer, 1st Earl of March||1328||1330||Attainted, and his honour were forfeited
|-
|none||1330||1354||Attainted
|-
|Earl of Cornwall (1328)||John of Eltham, Earl of Cornwall||1328||1336||New creation; died, title extinct
|-
|Earl of Devon (1335)||Hugh de Courtenay, 1st Earl of Devon||1335||1340||New creation
|-
|Earl of Salisbury (1337)||William Montagu, 1st Earl of Salisbury||1337||1344||New creation
|-
|Earl of Derby (1337)||Henry of Grosmont||1337||1361||New creation
|-
|Earl of Gloucester (1337)||Hugh de Audley, 1st Earl of Gloucester||1337||1347||New creation
|-
|Earl of Huntingdon (1337)||William de Clinton, Earl of Huntingdon||1337||1354||New creation; cr. Baron Clinton in 1330
|-
|Earl of Northampton (1337)||William de Bohun, 1st Earl of Northampton||1337||1360||New creation
|-
|Earl of Suffolk (1337)||Robert d'Ufford, 1st Earl of Suffolk||1337||1369||New creation
|-
|Earl of Pembroke (1339)||Laurence Hastings, 1st Earl of Pembroke||1339||1348||New creation
|-
|Baron de Ros (1264)||William de Ros, 2nd Baron de Ros||1316||1342||
|-
|Baron le Despencer (1264)||none||1326||1398||Attainted
|-
|Baron Basset of Drayton (1264)||Ralph Basset, 2nd Baron Basset of Drayton||1299||1343||
|-
|Baron Basset of Sapcote (1264)||Simon Basset, 4th Baron Basset of Sapcote||1326||1360||Never summoned to Parliament
|-
|Baron Mowbray (1283)||John de Mowbray, 3rd Baron Mowbray||1322||1361||
|-
|Baron Hastings (1290)||Laurence Hastings, 3rd Baron Hastings||1325||1348||Created Earl of Pembroke, see above
|- 
|Baron Astley (1295)||Thomas de Astley, 3rd Baron Astley||1314||1359||
|- 
|Baron Berkeley (1295)||Thomas de Berkeley, 3rd Baron Berkeley||1326||1361||
|- 
|Baron Canville (1295)||William de Canville, 2nd Baron Canville||1308||1338||Died, title fell into abeyance
|- 
|Baron Clavering (1295)||John de Clavering||1310||1332||Died, none of his heirs were summoned to Parliament in respect of this Barony
|- 
|Baron Corbet (1295)||John Corbet, 3rd Baron Corbet||1322||1347||
|- 
|Baron Fauconberg (1295)||John de Fauconberg, 3rd Baron Fauconberg||1318||1349||
|- 
|Baron FitzWalter (1295)||John FitzWalter, 3rd Baron FitzWalter||1328||1361||
|- 
|Baron FitzWarine (1295)||Fulke FitzWarine, 2nd Baron FitzWarine||1315||1349||
|- 
|Baron Grey de Wilton (1295)||Henry Grey, 3rd Baron Grey de Wilton||1323||1342||
|-
|rowspan="2"|Baron Hussee (1295)||Henry Hussee, 1st Baron Hussee||1295||1332||Died
|- 
|Henry Hussee, 2nd Baron Hussee||1332||1349||
|- 
|Baron Hylton (1295)||Alexander Hylton, 2nd Baron Hylton||1322||1360||
|- 
|rowspan="2"|Baron Knovill (1295)||Bogo de Knovill, 2nd Baron Knovill||1306||1338||
|- 
|John de Knovill, 3rd Baron Knovill||1338||13??||Title extinct on his death
|- 
|Baron Kyme (1295)||William de Kyme, 2nd Baron Kyme||1323||1338||Died, title extinct
|- 
|Baron Mauley (1295)||Peter de Mauley, 2nd Baron Mauley||1310||1355||
|- 
|Baron Montfort (1295)||John de Montfort, 3rd Baron Montfort||1314||1367||
|- 
|rowspan="2"|Baron Neville de Raby (1295)||Ralph Neville, 1st Baron Neville de Raby||1295||1331||Died
|- 
|Ralph Neville, 2nd Baron Neville de Raby||1331||1367||
|- 
|rowspan="2"|Baron Poyntz (1295)||Hugh Poyntz, 3rd Baron Poyntz||1311||1333||Died
|- 
|Nicholas Poyntz, 4thd Baron Poyntz||1333||1360||
|- 
|Baron Segrave (1295)||John de Segrave, 3rd Baron Segrave||1325||1353||
|- 
|Baron Umfraville (1295)||Gilbert de Umfraville, 3rd Baron Umfraville||1325||1381||
|- 
|Baron Wake (1295)||John Wake, 1st Baron Wake||1300||1349||
|- 
|Baron Bardolf (1299)||John Bardolf, 3rd Baron Bardolf||1328||1363||
|- 
|rowspan="2"|Baron Clinton (1299)||John de Clinton, 2nd Baron Clinton||1310||1335||Died
|- 
|John de Clinton, 3rd Baron Clinton||1335||1398||
|- 
|Baron De La Warr (1299)||John la Warr, 2nd Baron De La Warr||1320||1347||
|- 
|Baron Deincourt (1299)||William Deincourt, 2nd Baron Deincourt||1327||1364||
|- 
|Baron Devereux (1299)||William Devereux, 1st Baron Devereux||1299||1330?||
|- 
|Baron Ferrers of Chartley (1299)||Robert de Ferrers, 3rd Baron Ferrers of Chartley||1324||1350||
|- 
|Baron FitzPayne (1299)||Robert FitzPayne, 2nd Baron FitzPayne||1316||1354||
|- 
|rowspan="2"|Baron Grandison (1299)||William de Grandison, 1st Baron Grandison||1299||1335||Died
|- 
|Peter de Grandison, 2nd Baron Grandison||1335||1358||
|- 
|Baron Lovel (1299)||John Lovel, 3rd Baron Lovel||1314||1347||
|- 
|rowspan="2"|Baron Mohun (1299)||John de Mohun, 1st Baron Mohun||1299||1330||Died
|- 
|John de Mohun, 2nd Baron Mohun||1330||1376||
|- 
|Baron Mortimer of Chirke (1299)||Roger de Mortimer, 1st Baron Mortimer of Chirke||1299||1336||Died, none of his heirs were summoned to Parliament in respect of this Barony
|- 
|Baron Multon of Egremont (1299)||John de Multon, 2nd Baron Multon of Egremont||1322||1334||Died, Barony fell into abeyance
|- 
|Baron Percy (1299)||Henry de Percy, 2nd Baron Percy||1315||1352||
|- 
|Baron Rivers of Ongar (1299)||John Rivers, 2nd Baron Rivers||1311||1350||
|- 
|Baron Scales (1299)||Robert de Scales, 3rd Baron Scales||1324||1369||
|- 
|Baron Stafford (1299)||Ralph de Stafford, 2nd Baron Stafford||1309||1372||
|- 
|Baron Tregoz (1299)||Thomas de Tregoz, 3rd Baron Tregoz||1322||1405||
|- 
|Baron Welles (1299)||Adam de Welles, 3rd Baron Welles||1320||1345||
|- 
|rowspan="2"|Baron Beauchamp of Somerset (1299)||John de Beauchamp, 1st Baron Beauchamp||1299||1336||Died
|- 
|John de Beauchamp, 2nd Baron Beauchamp||1336||1343||
|- 
|Baron Cauntelo (1299)||Nicholas de Cauntelo, 3rd Baron Cauntelo||1321||1355||
|- 
|Baron de Clifford (1299)||Robert de Clifford, 3rd Baron de Clifford||1322||1344||
|- 
|Baron Darcy (1299)||Philip Darcy, Baron Darcy||1299||1332||Died, none of his heirs were summoned to Parliament in respect of this Barony
|- 
|Baron Ferrers of Groby (1299)||Henry Ferrers, 2nd Baron Ferrers of Groby||1325||1343||
|- 
|rowspan="3"|Baron Furnivall (1299)||Thomas de Furnivall, 1st Baron Furnivall||1299||1332||Died
|- 
|Thomas de Furnivall, 2nd Baron Furnivall||1332||1339||Died
|- 
|Thomas de Furnivall, 3rd Baron Furnivall||1339||1364||
|- 
|rowspan="2"|Baron Grendon (1299)||Ralph Grendon, 1st Baron Grendon||1299||1331||Died
|- 
|Robert Grendon, 2nd Baron Grendon||1331||1348||
|- 
|Baron Lancaster (1299)||John de Lancastre, 1st Baron Lancastre||1299||1334||Died, title extinct
|- 
|Baron Latimer (1299)||Thomas Latimer, 1st Baron Latimer||1299||1334||Died, none of his heirs were summoned to Parliament in respect of this Barony
|- 
|rowspan="2"|Baron Latimer (1299)||William Latimer, 3rd Baron Latimer||1327||1335||Died
|- 
|William Latimer, 4th Baron Latimer||1335||1381||
|- 
|Baron Lisle (1299)||John de Lisle, 2nd Baron Lisle||1304||1337||Died
|- 
|Baron Montagu (1299)||William de Montacute, 3rd Baron Montagu||1319||1344||Created Earl of Salisbury, see above
|- 
|Baron Morley (1299)||Robert de Morley, 2nd Baron Morley||1310||1360||
|- 
|Baron Saint John of Lageham (1299)||John St John, 3rd Baron Saint John of Lageham||1323||1349||
|- 
|Baron Strange of Knockyn (1299)||Roger le Strange, 4th Baron Strange of Knockyn||1324||1349||
|- 
|rowspan="2"|Baron Sudeley (1299)||John de Sudeley, 1st Baron Sudeley||1299||1336||Died
|- 
|John de Sudeley, 2nd Baron Sudeley||1336||1340||
|- 
|Baron Botetourt (1305)||John de Botetourt, 2nd Baron Botetourt||1324||1385||
|- 
|Baron Multon of Gilsland (1307)||John de Multon, 2nd Baron Multon of Gilsland||1313||1334||Died, Barony fell into abeyance
|- 
|rowspan="2"|Baron Boteler of Wemme (1308)||William Le Boteler, 1st Baron Boteler of Wemme||1308||1334||Died
|- 
|William Le Boteler, 2nd Baron Boteler of Wemme||1334||1361||
|- 
|Baron Cromwell (1308)||John de Cromwell, 1st Baron Cromwell||1308||1335||Died, title extinct
|- 
|Baron Grelle (1308)||Thomas de Grelle, 1st Baron Grelle||1308||1347||
|- 
|Baron Zouche of Haryngworth (1308)||William la Zouche, 1st Baron Zouche||1308||1352||
|- 
|Baron Ufford (1309)||Robert de Ufford, 2nd Baron Ufford||1316||1369||Created Earl of Suffolk, see above
|- 
|Baron Beaumont (1309)||Henry Beaumont, 1st Baron Beaumont||1309||1340||
|- 
|Baron Everingham (1309)||Adam Everingham, 1st Baron Everingham||1309||1341||
|- 
|Baron FitzHenry (1309)||Aucher FitzHenry, 1st Baron FitzHenry||1309||1339||Died, none of his heirs were summoned to Parliament in respect of this Barony
|- 
|Baron Monthermer (1309)||Thomas de Monthermer, 2nd Baron Monthermer||1325||1340||
|- 
|Baron Strange of Blackmere (1309)||John le Strange, 2nd Baron Strange of Blackmere||1324||1349||
|- 
|Baron Badlesmere (1309)||Giles de Badlesmere, 2nd Baron Badlesmere||1322||1338||Died, Barony fell into abeyance
|- 
|Baron Lisle (1311)||Robert de Lisle, 1st Baron Lisle||1311||1343||
|- 
|rowspan="2"|Baron Nevill (1311)||Hugh de Nevill, 1st Baron Nevill||1311||1336||Died
|- 
|John de Nevill, 2nd Baron Nevill||1336||1358||
|- 
|Baron Audley of Heleigh (1313)||James de Audley, 2nd Baron Audley of Heleigh||1316||1386||
|- 
|Baron Bavent (1313)||Roger Bavent, 1st Baron Bavent||1313||1335||Died, none of his heirs were summoned to Parliament in respect of this Barony
|- 
|Baron Brun (1313)||Maurice le Brun, 1st Baron Brun||1313||1355||
|- 
|rowspan="2"|Baron Cobham of Kent (1313)||Henry de Cobham, 1st Baron Cobham of Kent||1313||1339||Died
|- 
|John de Cobham, 2nd Baron Cobham of Kent||1339||1355||
|- 
|Baron FitzBernard (1313)||Thomas Fitzbernard, 1st Baron Fitzbernard||1313||Bef. 1334||Died, none of his heirs were summoned to Parliament in respect of this Barony
|- 
|Baron Northwode (1313)||Roger de Northwode, 2nd Baron Northwode||1319||1361||
|- 
|rowspan="2"|Baron Saint Amand (1313)||John de St Amand, 1st Baron Saint Amand||1313||1330||Died
|- 
|Almaric de St Amand, 2nd Baron Saint Amand||1330||1382||
|- 
|Baron Cherleton (1313)||John Cherleton, 1st Baron Cherleton||1313||1353||
|- 
|Baron Marmion (1313)||John Marmion, 2nd Baron Marmion||1323||1335||Died, none of his heirs were summoned to Parliament in respect of this Barony
|- 
|Baron Say (1313)||Geoffrey de Say, 2nd Baron Say||1322||1359||
|- 
|Baron Willoughby de Eresby (1313)||John de Willoughby, 2nd Baron Willoughby de Eresby||1317||1349||
|- 
|Baron Camoys (1313)||Ralph de Camoys, 1st Baron Camoys||1313||1335||Died, none of his heirs were summoned to Parliament in respect of this Barony
|- 
|Baron Columbers (1314)||Philip de Columbers, 1st Baron Columbers||1314||1342||
|- 
|Baron Holand (1314)||Robert de Holland, 2nd Baron Holand||1328||1373||
|- 
|Baron Audley (1317)||Hugh de Audley, 1st Baron Audley||1317||1347||Created Earl of Gloucester, see above
|- 
|rowspan="2"|Baron Strabolgi (1318)||David Strabolgi, 2nd Baron Strabolgi||1326||1335||
|- 
|David Strabolgi, 3rd Baron Strabolgi||1335||1375||
|- 
|Baron Arcedekne (1321)||John le Arcedekne, 2nd Baron Arcedekne||1329||1350||
|- 
|rowspan="2"|Baron Dacre (1321)||Ralph Dacre, 1st Baron Dacre||1321||1339||Died
|- 
|William Dacre, 2nd Baron Dacre||1339||1361||
|- 
|Baron FitzHugh (1321)||Henry FitzHugh, 1st Baron FitzHugh||1321||1356||
|- 
|Baron Greystock (1321)||William de Greystock, 2nd Baron Greystock||1323||1358||
|- 
|Baron Lucy (1321)||Anthony de Lucy, 1st Baron Lucy||1321||1343||
|- 
|Baron Pecche of Wormleighton (1321)||John Peche, 1st Baron Peche||1321||1339||Died, none of his heirs were summoned to Parliament in respect of this Barony
|- 
|Baron Zouche of Mortimer (1323)||William la Zouche, 1st Baron Zouche of Mortimer||1323||1337||Died, none of his heirs were summoned to Parliament in respect of this Barony
|- 
|Baron Aton (1324)||Gilbert de Aton, 1st Baron Aton||1324||1342||
|- 
|Baron Grey of Ruthin (1325)||Roger Grey, 1st Baron Grey de Ruthyn||1324||1353||
|- 
|Baron Harington (1326)||John Harington, 1st Baron Harington||1324||1347||
|- 
|rowspan="2"|Baron Blount (1326)||Thomas le Blount, 1st Baron Blount||1326||1330||Died
|- 
|William le Blount, 2nd Baron Blount||1330||aft. 1366||
|- 
|Baron Cobham of Rundale (1326)||Stephen de Cobham, 1st Baron Cobham of Rundale||1326||1332||Died, none of his heirs were summoned to Parliament in respect of this Barony
|- 
|Baron D'Amorie (1326)||Richard D'Amorie, 1st Baron D'Amorie||1326||1330||Died, none of his heirs were summoned to Parliament in respect of this Barony
|- 
|Baron Strange (1326)||Eubulus le Strange, 1st Baron Strange||1326||1335||Died, title extinct
|- 
|Baron Wateville (1326)||Robert Wateville, 1st Baron Wateville||1326||1333||Nothing further is known of him
|- 
|Baron Burgh (1327)||William de Burgh, 1st Baron Burgh||1327||1333||Died, none of his heirs were summoned to Parliament in respect of this Barony
|- 
|Baron Ingham (1328)||Oliver de Ingham, 1st Baron Ingham||1328||1344||
|- 
|Baron Burghersh (1330)||Bartholomew de Burghersh, 1st Baron Burghersh||1330||1355||New creation
|- 
|Baron Maltravers (1330)||John Maltravers, 1st Baron Maltravers||1330||1364||New creation
|- 
|Baron Darcy de Knayth (1332)||John Darcy, 1st Baron Darcy de Knayth||1332||1347||New creation
|- 
|Baron Ros of Watton (1332)||John de Ros, 1st Baron Ros of Watton||1332||1338||New creation; died, title extinct
|- 
|Baron Talbot (1332)||Gilbert Talbot, 1st Baron Talbot||1332||1346||New creation
|- 
|Baron Uvedale (1332)||Peter de Uvedale, 1st Baron Uvedale||1332||1336||New creation; died, title extinct
|- 
|Baron Verdon (1332)||John de Verdon, 1st Baron Verdon||1332||1342||New creation
|- 
|Baron Hausted (1332)||John de Hausted, 1st Baron Hausted||1332||1336||New creation; died, none of his heirs were summoned to Parliament in respect of this Barony
|- 
|rowspan="2"|Baron Sutton of Holderness (1332)||John Sutton, 1st Baron Sutton of Holderness||1332||1338||New creation; died
|- 
|John Sutton, 2nd Baron Sutton of Holderness||1338||1356||
|- 
|Baron Edrington (1336)||Henry de Edrington, 1st Baron Edrington||1336||?||New creation; nothing further is known of him
|- 
|Baron Meinell (1336)||William de Meinill, 1st Baron Meinill||1336||1342||New creation
|- 
|Baron Frene (1336)||Hugh de Frene, 1st Baron Frene||1336||1336||New creation; died, title extinct
|- 
|Baron Swynnerton (1337)||Roger Swynnerton, 1st Baron Swynnerton||1337||1338||New creation; died, title dormant
|- 
|Baron Leyburn (1337)||John de Leyburn, 1st Baron Leyburn||1337||1384||New creation
|- 
|Baron Monthermer (1337)||Edward de Monthermer, 1st Baron Monthermer||1337||?||New creation; died, title extinct
|- 
|rowspan="2"|Baron Poynings (1337)||Thomas de Poynings, 1st Baron Poynings||1337||1339||New creation, died
|- 
|Michael de Poynings, 2nd Baron Poynings||1339||1369||
|- 
|Baron Chandos (1337)||Roger de Chandos, 1st Baron Chandos||1337||1353||New creation
|- 
|Baron le Despencer (1330)||Hugh le Despencer, 1st Baron le Despencer||1338||1349||New creation
|- 
|Baron Grey of Rotherfield (1330)||John de Grey, 1st Baron Grey of Rotherfield||1338||1360||New creation
|- 
|}

Peerage of Scotland

|rowspan=2|Earl of Mar (1114)||Domhnall II, Earl of Mar||1305||1332||Died
|-
|Thomas, Earl of Mar||1332||1377||
|-
|Earl of Dunbar (1115)||Patrick V, Earl of March||1308||1368||
|-
|Earl of Strathearn (1115)||Maol Íosa V, Earl of Strathearn||1329||1334||Attainted, and his honours became forfeited
|-
|Earl of Fife (1129)||Donnchadh IV, Earl of Fife||1288||1353||
|-
|rowspan=2|Earl of Menteith (1160)||Muireadhach III, Earl of Menteith||1308||1333||Died
|-
|Mary II, Countess of Menteith||1333||1360||
|-
|rowspan=2|Earl of Lennox (1184)||Maol Choluim II, Earl of Lennox||1291||1333||Died
|-
|Domhnall, Earl of Lennox||1333||1373||
|-
|rowspan=3|Earl of Ross (1215)||Uilleam II, Earl of Ross||1274||1333||Died
|-
|Hugh, Earl of Ross||1333||1334||Died
|-
|Uilleam III, Earl of Ross||1334||1372||
|-
|rowspan=2|Earl of Sutherland (1235)||William de Moravia, 3rd Earl of Sutherland||1307||1330||Died
|-
|William de Moravia, 5th Earl of Sutherland||1333||1370||
|-
|rowspan=3|Earl of Moray (1312)||Thomas Randolph, 1st Earl of Moray||1312||1332||Died
|-
|Thomas Randolph, 2nd Earl of Moray||1332||1332||Died
|-
|John Randolph, 3rd Earl of Moray||1332||1346||
|-
|Earl of Atholl (1320)||John Campbell, Earl of Atholl||1320||1333||Died, title extinct
|-
|rowspan=2|Earl of Angus (1330)||John Stewart, 1st Earl of Angus||1330||1331||New creation; died
|-
|Thomas Stewart, 2nd Earl of Angus||1331||1361||
|-
|}

Peerage of Ireland

|rowspan=2|Earl of Ulster (1264)||William Donn de Burgh, 3rd Earl of Ulster||1326||1333||
|-
|Elizabeth de Burgh, 4th Countess of Ulster||1333||1363||
|-
|Earl of Kildare (1316)||Maurice FitzGerald, 4th Earl of Kildare||1329||1390||
|-
|rowspan=2|Earl of Ormond (1328)||James Butler, 1st Earl of Ormond||1328||1338||Died
|-
|James Butler, 2nd Earl of Ormond||1338||1382||
|-
|Earl of Desmond (1329)||Maurice FitzGerald, 1st Earl of Desmond||1329||1356||
|-
|Baron Athenry (1172)||Thomas de Bermingham||1322||1374||
|-
|rowspan=2|Baron Kingsale (1223)||Miles de Courcy, 6th Baron Kingsale||1303||1338||Died
|-
|Miles de Courcy, 7th Baron Kingsale||1338||1358||
|-
|rowspan=2|Baron Kerry (1223)||Maurice Fitzmaurice, 4th Baron Kerry||1324||1339||Died
|-
|John Fitzmaurice, 5th Baron Kerry||1339||1348||
|-
|rowspan=2|Baron Barry (1261)||John Barry, 4th Baron Barry||1290||1330||Died
|-
|David Barry, 5th Baron Barry||1330||1347||
|-
|}

References

 

Lists of peers by decade
1330s in England
1330s in Ireland
14th century in Scotland
14th-century English people
14th-century Irish people
14th-century Scottish earls
1330 in Europe
14th century in England
14th century in Ireland
Peers